The 2012 Ashbourne Cup inter-collegiate camogie championship was staged at the Waterford IT sports complex in Carraiganore over the weekend of 18–19 February. It was won for the fourth time in succession by Waterford Institute of Technology, after defeating University of Limerick in the final by ten points after UL's semi-final victory over Waterford's opponents in the 2010 and 2011 finals. Player of the tournament was WIT's Katrina Parrock.

The Final
The turning point in the final arrived midway through the second half when All Ireland medallist midfielder Katrina Parrock switched into full forward and made no scored a goal from close range. Kilkenny attacker Marie Dargan added a second goal three minutes later. Waterford IT then pulled away with four unanswered points. Their Waterford IT forward line consisted of five Kilkenny county players.

Arrangements
The format was changed for the 2012 competition. In the final stages of the competition, six teams were divided into two groups of three in which each team plays two matches. The top two in each group went through to the cup semi finals while the bottom team in each group played in the final of the Ashbourne Shield. UL defeated University College Cork in the semi final by 0–10 to 1–5 and WIT defeated UCD 3–12 to 2–4. UUJ won the Ashbourne Shield defeating NUIG 2–13 to 3–9 with goals from Karen Kielt and Captain Sara Louise Carr.

Purcell Cup
The Purcell Cup was also re-formatted to a six-team competition and won by Dublin City University for the first time. DCU beat NUIM 5–12 to 1–6 and defending Purcell Cup champions Queen's University Belfast defeated Dublin Institute of Technology 4–9 to 0–4 in the semi-finals. Goals from Aoife Bugler, Catriona Regan, Orlaith Durkan and Emma Brennan the helped Dublin City University to 
a 4–7 to 0–4 victory over Queen's in the Purcell Cup final. In the Ashbourne Shield University of Ulster Jordanstown recorded a thrilling 2–13 to 3–9 win over National University of Ireland Galway. Denise Luby scored 3–4 as Cork Institute of Technology were 4–11 to 0–2 winners in the Purcell Shield final against Athlone IT.

Fr Meachair Cup
Previously a sevens tournament, the Fr Meachair Cup was re-formatted as a third division inter-collegiate competition in 2012 and played in Waterford's De La Salle pitch over the Ashbourne weekend. Naomi Carroll scored ten points for Mary Immaculate College as they achieved a 0–15 to 0–3 win over St Patrick's College, Drumcondra in the Fr Meachair Cup final. In the Fr Meachair Cup semi-finals, St Patrick's College (2–8) defeated Trinity College (1–3) and Mary Immaculate College (3–10) defeated IT Carlow (0–4). St Mary's Belfast defeated IT Tralee 3–6 to 3–4 in the Fr Meachair Shield decider.

Ó Mhaolagáin cup
Soaring star Áine Keogh helped Dundalk IT win the reinvented Ó Mhaolagáin cup defeating Galway-Mayo Institute of Technology in the final. Limerick IT and Marino (who had Tara Ruttledge on their team) were the defeated semi-finalists. University of Ulster Coleraine  defeated Coláiste Froebel in the inaugural O’Mhaolagáin Shield final.

Ashbourne All Stars
The Ashbourne All Stars were selected at the end of the tournament.
Emma Staunton (UCD & Kilkenny), Ruth Jones (WIT & Kilkenny), Sarah Anne Fitzgerald (WIT & Laois), Shonagh Curran (UL & Waterford), Patricia Jackman (WIT & Waterford), Susan Vaughan (UL & Cork), Niamh O'Dea (UL & Cork), Lisa Bolger (UL & Wexford), Maria Walsh (UL & Cork), Joanne Casey (UCC & Cork) Sara Louise Carr (Jordanstown & Down), Denise Gaule (WIT & Kilkenny), Marie Dargan (WIT & Kilkenny), Katie Power (WIT & Kilkenny), Katrina Parrock (WIT & Wexford),

Purcell All Stars
The Purcell All Stars were selected at the end of the tournament.
Gráinne Smyth (DIT & Dublin), Rebecca Cleere (Maynooth) & Kilkenny), Lisa Carey (DCU & Kilkenny), Danielle McCrystal (QUB & Derry), Mairéad Power (DCU & Kilkenny), Emma Brennan (DCU & Carlow), Kristina Troy (Maynooth) & Meath), Katie Campbell (Mary I Limerick & Limerick), Laura Twomey (DCU & Dublin), Orlaith Walsh (St Pats, Drumcondra & Kilkenny), Sinéad Cassidy (QUB & Derry), Ciara Donnelly (QUB & Armagh), Orla Durkan (DCU & Dublin), Naomi Carroll (Mary I Limerick & Clare), Denise Luby (Cork IT & Cork)

Fixtures and results

Ashbourne/Purcell Playoff

The play-off determined that Jordanstown would play in the Ashbourne Cup and Cork IT would play in the Purcell Cup.

Group A

Group B

Ashbourne group B

References

Ashbourne Cup
Ashbourne Cup